Operation Hiram was a military operation conducted by the Israel Defense Forces (IDF) during the 1948 Arab-Israeli War. It was led by General Moshe Carmel, and aimed at capturing the Upper Galilee region from the Arab Liberation Army (ALA) forces led by Fawzi al-Qawuqji and a Syrian battalion. The operation, which lasted 60 hours (October 29–31), was marked by heavy fighting between Arabs and Jews, and ended just before the ceasefire with the neighboring Arab countries went into effect.

As a result of the operation, the Upper Galilee, originally slated by the United Nations partition plan to be part of an Arab state, would be controlled by the newly formed state of Israel, and more than 50,000 new Palestinian refugees were expelled from their homes.

Overview

On 18 July, the second truce of the conflict went into effect. On September 26, 1948, David Ben-Gurion told his cabinet that if fighting should be renewed in the north, then the Galilee would become "clean" [naki] and "empty" [reik] of Arabs, and implied that he had been assured of this by his generals.

Before dawn on 22 October ALA violated the truce when it stormed the IDF hilltop position of Sheikh Abd, overlooking kibbutz Manara from the north. During the 24–25 October, ALA troops regularly sniped at Manara and at traffic along the main road. Fawzi al-Qawuqji demanded that Israel evacuate neighboring kibbutz Yiftah and thin out its forces in Manara. Israel, in turn, demanded the ALA’s withdrawal from the captured positions and, after a “no” from Qawuqji, informed the United Nations that it felt free to do as it pleased.

The operation was launched on the night of 28–29 October 1948, fielding four IDF brigades, the Seventh, Carmeli Brigade, Golani, and the Oded Brigade. The operational order was "to destroy the enemy in the central Galilee "pocket", to occupy the whole of the Galilee and to establish the defense line on the country´s northern border." On October 29, Yosef Weitz, learning about the start of the operation, sent Yigael Yadin a note urging that the army should expel the "refugees" from the newly conquered areas.

The Ground offensive was preceded by bombing raids targeting Tarshiha, Jish and Sa'sa from the 22 October, using Boeing B-17 Flying Fortresses and Douglas C-47 Skytrains (converted for bombing role). The heaviest night of bombing was 29/30 October when 13 missions dropped 21 tons of bombs on the seven villages. The bombardment of Tarshiha triggered the mass flight after 24 of the inhabitants were killed and approximately 60 were buried under rubble.

The initial thrust was carried out by the Seventh Brigade advancing from Safad. The Seventh Brigade occupied Qaddita on 29 October, Meirun and then Safsaf and Jish. In the 79th Battalion's report, the battles for Safsaf and Jish were described as "difficult" and "cruel" (achzari). One IDF report said "150–200" Arabs, "including a number of civilians" died in the battle for Jish. Other accounts report that 200 bodies were found around Jish and 80 at Meirum. After Safsaf had been captured the Israeli troops committed a massacre.

From Jish, the 72nd and 79th battalions then turned west to take Sa'sa. After taking Sa'sa the Israeli forces then turned northwest taking Kfar Birem, Saliha and by the afternoon of the 30 October were at al Malikiya.

Simultaneously, the Golani Brigade engaged in diversionary tactics in the direction of the village of Illaboun. The Carmeli Brigade, which was assigned to counter attacks from Syria and Lebanon, crossed the border into Lebanon, captured 15 villages, and reached the Litani River. General Carmel  had received direct permission from Prime Minister Ben Gurion to enter Lebanon, but only as far as the river. In the final hours of the offensive Carmel's second-in-command, General Makleff, met Ben Gurion in Tiberias and requested permission to advance and occupy Beirut which he claimed could be reached in twelve hours. Fearing international condemnation Ben Gurion refused.

Ceasefire was scheduled to commence at 11:00 hours, October 31, 1948. The same day, at 7:30 in the morning, Major General Moshe Carmel ordered his brigades and district commanders "to continue the clearing operations inside the Galilee". In a cable dated 10:00 hours the same day Carmel ordered his brigades and district commanders: "Do all in your power for a quick and immediate clearing [tihur] of the conquered areas of all the hostile elements in line with the orders that have been issued[.] The inhabitants of the areas conquered should be assisted to leave." This order was apparently issued after Carmel had met with Ben-Gurion the same day.

On 31 October and 1 November 1948 the Hula massacre took place at the Lebanese village of Hula (Hule). The village had been captured on October 24 by the Carmeli Brigade without any resistance at all. Between 35 and 58 captured men were reportedly shot down in a house which was later blown up on top of them.

At the end of this lightning attack, Israeli forces reached the Hiram Junction, north of Safed. The siege of Manara was lifted, Qawuqji's army fled to Lebanon, and the roads crossing the Upper Galilee were secured. With the Galilee under Israeli control, the IDF established a defensive line along the Litani before withdrawing to the Lebanese border under the terms of the 1949 Armistice Agreements.

The Israeli Air Force bombings caused considerable damage to the villages in the area. Ilan Pappe gives the example of the four villages: Rama, Suhmata, Malkiyya and Kfar Bir'im. He states that out of the four 'the only village to remain intact was Rama. The other three were occupied and destroyed'. Very few villagers were allowed to stay in their homes and many were imprisoned or expelled to Lebanon and elsewhere. Ilan Pappe claims that the 'Hebrew noun tihur (cleansing) assumed new meanings' during this time period. He argues that although 'it still described, as before, the total expulsion and destruction of a village, it could now also represent other activities, such as selective search and expulsion operations'.

One Israeli estimate gives a total of 400 Arabs killed during the offensive and 550 taken prisoner.

The name is a reference to Hiram I, the Biblical king of Tyre. He was instrumental in the construction of the First Temple of Jerusalem.

Massacres 

Around 10 massacres occurred during this two-day operation which coincided with another mass killing south east of Tel Aviv.

According to Morris, the atrocities committed during Operation Hiram clearly embarrassed the IDF and Israeli officials who were soon forced to respond to Arab and United Nations charges in various forums. The main official Israeli response was a flat or qualified denial that atrocities had taken place.

Arab communities captured in Operation Hiram

Brigades participating in Operation Hiram 
 Carmeli Brigade
 Golani Brigade
 Sheva' Brigade
 Oded Brigade

See also
 Correcting a Mistake: Jews and Arabs in Palestine/Israel, 1936-1956
 Depopulated Palestinian locations in Israel

References

Bibliography
 Walid Khalidi (editor), All that remains: the Palestinian villages occupied and depopulated by Israel in 1948. (1992). Institute of Palestine Studies. .
Benvenisti, Meron (2000). Sacred Landscape: The Buried History of the Holy Land Since 1948. University of California Press. ,
Morris, Benny (2004). The Birth of the Palestinian Refugee Problem Revisited Cambridge: Cambridge University Press. 
Nazzal, Nafez (1978): The Palestinian Exodus from Galilee 1948, The Institute for Palestine Studies, (Safsaf, p. 93–96, 107)
 Ilan Pappé (2006) The Ethnic Cleansing of Palestine Oneworld publications

External links
The sons of Eilaboun tells the story of the human toll that Operation Hiram claimed on in the village Eilaboun.

Hiram
October 1948 events in Asia
1948 in Mandatory Palestine
1948 in Israel